Herbert Deinert (December 13, 1930 – August 4, 2010) was a Professor Emeritus in the Department of German Studies, Cornell University. He was a noted scholar focusing on German literature and intellectual history since the time of Martin Luther.  His early work centered on the influence of Rilke on music but later focused on the works of Goethe (especially Faust), Hesse, Kafka, Mann, Brecht.  More recently he has helped to understand the influence of Protestantism on Germany directly after the fall of the Berlin Wall.  Writing on the subject, Deinert said:

Many forces contributed to the collapse of the GDR as a separate state, the final and most visible was the mass exodus via Hungary and  Czechoslovakia.  The Communist regime resisted change when change was taking place in most of East Germany's neighbors to the east and southeast.  But an ever increasing number of increasingly restless citizens insisted on it and, not given a chance to change matters by improving the system, effected the most radical change of all: they swept away an unresponsive, cynical and calcified government.  In this process  the role of one institution stands out, that of the Protestant Church...

External links
Herbert Deinert

1930 births
2010 deaths
Cornell University faculty